Juliane Elisabeth von Wallenstein née von Uffeln (1618-1692) was a Danish courtier, Overhofmesterinde to the queen of Denmark, Charlotte Amalie of Hesse-Kassel, from 1677 to 1692.

She married the German chamberlain and nobleman Gottfried von Wallenstein in 1636. 

She served as chief lady-in-waiting to Margravine Hedwig Sophie of Brandenburg in 1667-69, and to queen Charlotte Amalie in 1677-92.  She is described as a confidante of the queen, who reportedly loved and trusted her.

References

 Leonora Christina,   Jammers Minde: Med forord af Dorrit Willumsen
 Louis Bobé,  Charlotte Amalie: reine de Danemark, princesses de Hesse-Cassel, et les origines des églises réformées allemande et franc̦aise de Copenhague, 1940

1618 births
1692 deaths
Court of Christian V of Denmark
17th-century Danish people
Danish ladies-in-waiting